Antoinette Lovell Patterson (born May 4, 1969), known simply by her first name Antoinette, is an American rapper from Bronx, New York, who released two albums, during the late 1980s and early 1990s.

She is mainly remembered for her beef with MC Lyte. She was mentioned in the Vibe Hip-Hop Divas publication and her song "I Got An Attitude" (1987) was included in Complex list of "The 50 Best Rap Songs by Women".

Biography
She made her first appearance on the producer Hurby Azor's 1987 compilation album, Hurby's Machine, with her song "I Got An Attitude".

Discography

Studio albums

Singles

As lead artist

Featured singles

Promotional singles

Guest appearances

References

Notes

Citations

External links

American women rappers
African-American women rappers
Rappers from the Bronx
1969 births
Living people
East Coast hip hop musicians
African-American songwriters
Songwriters from New York (state)
21st-century American rappers
21st-century American women musicians
21st-century African-American women
21st-century African-American musicians
20th-century African-American people
20th-century African-American women
21st-century women rappers